Darren Robert Jarman (born 28 January 1967) is a former Australian rules footballer who played for the Hawthorn Football Club and Adelaide Football Club in the Australian Football League (AFL), and for the North Adelaide Football Club in the South Australian National Football League (SANFL). Jarman is recognized, along with older brother Andrew, as one of the most skilful South Australian footballers of the late 1980s and 1990s. While Andrew was renowned for his constructive handball skills, Darren was regarded as one of the finest kicks on either foot, whether passing to a leading forward or shooting for goal.

SANFL career (1985–1990) 

Jarman played 117 games and kicked 211 goals for North Adelaide in the SANFL between 1985 and 1990. The highlight of this period was playing in the 1987 SANFL Grand Final premiership victory with brother Andrew. He was selected on the interchange in the club's Team of the Century at a gala dinner held on 7 October 2000. He also played 27 night series/pre-season competition matches for North Adelaide, in which he kicked 25 goals.

Hawthorn (1991–1995) 
Jarman was initially drafted by Melbourne with pick 55 in the inaugural 1986 VFL Draft., but chose to remain in Adelaide with the Roosters. Once the Demons' three-year rights to Jarman lapsed, Brisbane claimed him with a concessional pre-draft selection in the 1989 VFL Draft. Once again Jarman chose to stay in his home state.

In 1990 the turmoil that led to the creation of the Adelaide Crows and thereby automatically relegated the SANFL to secondary importance within South Australia caused Jarman to reassess his career. Following some friction with the Crows' football manager Neil Kerley, Jarman chose to head east, signing for Hawthorn after the club traded pick 10 in the 1990 AFL Draft to the Bears for his contractual rights.
 
In Round 1, 1991 Jarman made his debut in an 86-point loss to Adelaide. Despite this early setback, the highly skilled midfielder made an immediate impact in his debut year, averaging 18 disposals and booting 41 goals before his infamous performance in the Hawks' winning side on Grand Final day, when he was restricted to just 5 touches on the big stage.

Jarman bounced back in 1992, winning his first All-Australian selection (at centreman) and stamping himself as one of the game's elite players. Following his excellent 1995 season where he won his second All-Australian selection, Hawthorn's Best and Fairest Award and finished with the second-most votes behind Sydney's Paul Kelly in the Brownlow Medal count (although he was ineligible to place due to suspension), Jarman sought a return home to Adelaide to play with his brother Andrew at the Crows.

Homecoming (1996–2001) 
In the 1995/6 offseason, Jarman was traded to the Adelaide Crows in a complex three-way deal that involved Paul Salmon moving from Essendon to Hawthorn, promising defender Sean Wellman moving from Adelaide to Essendon and a handful of peripheral draft picks and players exchanged between the three clubs.

As with his move to Glenferrie Oval five years earlier, Jarman had an immediate impact at his new club, winning his third All-Australian selection following a 400 disposal/46 goal season despite playing just 19 games. In the following years as he passed the age of 30, Jarman increasingly spent more time up forward, capturing the imagination of fans everywhere with remarkable performances in the Crows' back-to-back Grand Final wins, booting six goals against St Kilda in 1997 (five of which were in the last quarter) and five goals in the 1998 triumph over North Melbourne. Jarman's influence as a goalsneak in the twilight of his career was highlighted by his capture of the Crows' leading goalkicker award in 1998, 1999 and 2001.

In 2000 Jarman was named in the forward pocket in Adelaide's Team of the Decade 1991–2000.

Playing statistics

|-
|- style="background-color: #EAEAEA"
! scope="row" style="text-align:center" | 1991
|style="text-align:center;"|
| 11 || 24 || 41 || 28 || 297 || 136 || 433 || 74 || 39 || 1.7 || 1.2 || 12.4 || 5.7 || 18.0 || 3.1 || 1.6
|-
! scope="row" style="text-align:center" | 1992
|style="text-align:center;"|
| 11 || 23 || 30 || 30 || 395 || 148 || 543 || 112 || 49 || 1.3 || 1.3 || 17.2 || 6.4 || 23.6 || 4.9 || 2.1
|- style="background-color: #EAEAEA"
! scope="row" style="text-align:center" | 1993
|style="text-align:center;"|
| 11 || 21 || 24 || 15 || 319 || 141 || 460 || 117 || 63 || 1.1 || 0.7 || 15.2 || 6.7 || 21.9 || 5.6 || 3.0
|-
! scope="row" style="text-align:center" | 1994
|style="text-align:center;"|
| 11 || 21 || 16 || 11 || 304 || 157 || 461 || 95 || 83 || 0.8 || 0.5 || 14.5 || 7.5 || 22.0 || 4.5 || 4.0
|- style="background-color: #EAEAEA"
! scope="row" style="text-align:center" | 1995
|style="text-align:center;"|
| 11 || 20 || 11 || 11 || 346 || 127 || 473 || 67 || 71 || 0.6 || 0.6 || 17.3 || 6.4 || 23.7 || 3.4 || 3.6
|-
! scope="row" style="text-align:center" | 1996
|style="text-align:center;"|
| 3 || 19 || 46 || 17 || 286 || 112 || 398 || 96 || 42 || 2.4 || 0.9 || 15.1 || 5.9 || 20.9 || 5.1 || 2.2
|- style="background-color: #EAEAEA"
! scope="row" style="text-align:center" | 1997
|style="text-align:center;"|
| 3 || 24 || 39 || 17 || 381 || 125 || 506 || 104 || 67 || 1.6 || 0.7 || 15.9 || 5.2 || 21.1 || 4.3 || 2.8
|-
! scope="row" style="text-align:center;" | 1998
|style="text-align:center;"|
| 3 || 23 || 45 || 29 || 230 || 101 || 331 || 90 || 41 || 2.0 || 1.3 || 10.0 || 4.4 || 14.4 || 3.9 || 1.8
|- style="background-color: #EAEAEA"
! scope="row" style="text-align:center" | 1999
|style="text-align:center;"|
| 3 || 21 || 58 || 23 || 179 || 63 || 242 || 96 || 18 || 2.8 || 1.1 || 8.5 || 3.0 || 11.5 || 4.6 || 0.9
|-
! scope="row" style="text-align:center" | 2000
|style="text-align:center;"|
| 3 || 14 || 36 || 12 || 131 || 48 || 179 || 53 || 20 || 2.6 || 0.9 || 9.4 || 3.4 || 12.8 || 3.8 || 1.4
|- style="background-color: #EAEAEA"
! scope="row" style="text-align:center" | 2001
|style="text-align:center;"|
| 3 || 20 || 40 || 17 || 217 || 64 || 281 || 85 || 17 || 2.0 || 0.9 || 10.9 || 3.2 || 14.1 || 4.3 || 0.9
|- class="sortbottom"
! colspan=3| Career
! 230
! 386
! 210
! 3085
! 1222
! 4307
! 989
! 510
! 1.7
! 0.9
! 13.4
! 5.3
! 18.7
! 4.3
! 2.2
|}

Retirement and recognition 
An emotional Jarman retired after the 2001 Elimination Final loss to Carlton, closing the book on his playing career with a further 2 goals.

Darren loves a punt on the dogs and owns three harness trots tiger Tara being his best.

After being inducted into the SANFL Hall of Fame in 2006, on 19 July 2007 Jarman's outstanding 17-season career of top-flight football was recognised with induction into the Australian Football Hall of Fame.

Jarman was awarded Life Membership of the Adelaide Football Club in March 2008.

Coaching career 
From 2002 to 2004 Jarman re-joined the Adelaide Football Club as an assistant coach to Gary Ayres.

In 2006 he was appointed assistant coach to brother Andrew Jarman at North Adelaide, ending in 2007.

References

External links 

 Jarman inducted into Australian Football Hall of Fame
 Demon Wiki profile

1967 births
Living people
Adelaide Football Club players
Adelaide Football Club Premiership players
All-Australians (AFL)
Australian Football Hall of Fame inductees
Hawthorn Football Club players
Hawthorn Football Club Premiership players
North Adelaide Football Club players
Peter Crimmins Medal winners
South Australian Football Hall of Fame inductees
South Australian State of Origin players
Australian rules footballers from Adelaide
Sportsmen from South Australia
Three-time VFL/AFL Premiership players